Kairat Kelimbetov (born 28 January 1969) is a Kazakh politician, from 2020 to 2022, he held the position of the manager of the Astana International Financial Centre. He served as a Governor of the National Bank of Kazakhstan from October 1 of 2013 till November 2 of 2015. He served as a Vice-Prime Minister of Kazakhstan from January 20 of 2012 till October 1 of 2013. He also served as the CEO of Samruk-Kazyna Sovereign Wealth Fund and as the Minister of Economy and Budget Planning in the Government of Kazakhstan. In late July 2005 at that time a Minister Kelimbetov announced that Kazakhstan's GDP grew by 9.1% in the last year.

Mr. Kelimbetov was instrumental in developing numerous reforms and economic policies. As the Chief Executive of Samruk-Kazyna SWF he was responsible for the anti-crisis program launched in 2008, as well as the development programs of major state owned enterprises. As a deputy Prime Minister of Kazakhstan he represented the country during the creation of Eurasian Economic Union and oversaw macroeconomic policy of the government. Under his management the National Bank of Kazakhstan adopted a new monetary policy regime.

He is a graduate of Georgetown University's, Edmund A. Walsh School of Foreign Service (Pew Economic Freedom Fellows Program, 1999), the Kazakh State Academy of Economics (management, 1996), and  Lomonosov Moscow State University (Mathematics, 1993).

References

Living people
Chairmen of the National Bank of Kazakhstan
Ministers of Economy (Kazakhstan)
Ministers of Trade (Kazakhstan)
Moscow State University alumni
1969 births
Deputy Prime Ministers of Kazakhstan